Henry Plummer (1832–1864) was a prospector, lawman, and outlaw in the American West.

Henry Plummer may also refer to:

 Henry Stanley Plummer (1874–1936), internist and endocrinologist who co-founded the Mayo Clinic
 Henry V. Plummer (1844–1905), Baptist preacher and chaplain with the US Army Buffalo soldiers
 H. Vinton Plummer (1876–?), American lawyer and civil rights activist
 Henry Crozier Keating Plummer (1875–1946), English astronomer

See also
 Henry P. Cheatham (Henry Plummer Cheatham, 1857–1935), educator, farmer and politician from North Carolina
 Henry Plumer McIlhenny (1910–1986), American connoisseur of art and antiques, curator and chairman of the Philadelphia Museum of Art